Vitreolina arcuata is a species of sea snail, a marine gastropod mollusk in the family Eulimidae. The species is one of a number within the genus Vitreolina.

Distribution
This species occurs in the Caribbean Sea and in the Gulf of Mexico.

Description 
The maximum recorded shell length is 4.2 mm.

Habitat 
Minimum recorded depth is 0 m. Maximum recorded depth is 166 m.

References

 Rosenberg, G., F. Moretzsohn, and E. F. García. 2009. Gastropoda (Mollusca) of the Gulf of Mexico, Pp. 579–699 in Felder, D.L. and D.K. Camp (eds.), Gulf of Mexico–Origins, Waters, and Biota. Biodiversity. Texas A&M Press, College Station, Texas.

External links
 To World Register of Marine Species

arcuata
Gastropods described in 1850